The 1900 South Dakota gubernatorial election was held on November 6, 1900. Incumbent Governor Andrew E. Lee, a Populist elected under Fusion with Populists, Free Silver Republicans, and Democrats, opted to run for Congress rather than for a third term. Former Sioux Falls Mayor Burre H. Lien won the Fusion nomination and ran against former Lieutenant Governor Charles N. Herreid. However, despite the closeness of the 1896 and 1898 elections, the Fusion's luck ran out; Herreid defeated Lien in a landslide to reclaim the office for the Republican Party.

Republican convention
Several months prior to the Republican convention in Sioux Falls on May 24, 1900, former Lieutenant Governor Charles N. Herreid, who had previously sought the Republican nomination for Governor in 1896, announced that he would run for Governor. No serious challengers emerged, and he was seen as the likely frontrunner. At the convention, he was nominated unanimously.

Fusion conventions
At the Fusion convention in Yankton, former Sioux Falls Mayor Burre H. Lien and Railroad Commissioner W. T. LaFollette were mentioned as the leading candidates, though some delegates suspected that Governor Lee might be renominated for a third term, breaking "the unwritten law of the political parties of South Dakota." LaFollette's unpopularity led to his chances shrinking at the convention, and the momentum favored Lien; Lee, meanwhile, was floated as a Fusion candidate for Congress. Ultimately, Lien was nominated for Governor and Lee for Congress, which was ratified by the Populist and Democratic conventions.

General election

Results

References

South Dakota
1900
Gubernatorial
November 1900 events